The joint Claw-Eagle and Claw-Tiger operations (Turkish: Pençe-Kartal Operasyonu and Pençe-Kaplan Operasyonu) was a Turkish Armed Forces external operation in northern Iraq. The operation took place in the Qandil Mountains, the Sinjar District, and Makhmur, against Kurdistan Workers' Party (PKK) targets, as part of the ongoing Kurdish–Turkish and Kurdish–Iranian conflicts. Claw-Eagle, the air campaign, began on 15 June 2020. Claw-Tiger, the ground campaign, was launched on 17 June.

Background 
As part of the 2013–2015 peace talks, the Kurdistan Workers' Party agreed to move most of its fighters to the mountains in Iraqi Kurdistan. The Turkish Armed Forces also established bases in Iraq which sparked regional and international condemnation. The conflict reignited once more in June 2015, accompanied by ongoing Turkish involvement in the Syrian Civil War and harassment of Kurdish parties in Turkey.

Operation Claw-Eagle 
Turkish Armed Forces bombed Sinjar and destroyed multiple PKK camps near Yezedi villages. According to the locals, there were fears of ethnic cleansing and genocide by the Turkish State towards Yezidi's.

The Turkish government claimed that fighter jets destroyed caves in the Qandil Mountains used by the PKK.  The airstrikes also struck near Makhmour refugee camp, which hosts thousands of Turkish Kurd refugees who fled the conflict in the 1990s, as well as Yezidi villages in Sinjar. The Turkish Ministry of National Defense released a video of the airstrikes, claiming 81 targets were destroyed. On 25 June, a drone strike killed one or two PKK fighters outside a shop in Kuna Masi north of Sulaymaniyah, and injured six nearby civilians in the marketplace (two men, two women, and two children). Four of the wounded are in serious condition in Qalachwan Hospital.

Operation Claw-Tiger 
On 17 June, Turkish Land Forces launched a ground operation in the Haftanin region of Iraqi Kurdistan. Units of the Hakkari Mountain and Commando Brigade and 1st Commando Brigade were airlifted across the Iraq–Turkey border.

Iranian cooperation 

On 16 June, the Iranian military shelled the Choman area of the Qandil Mountains, an attack that is believed to have been coordinated with the simultaneous Turkish airstrikes. The collaboration is said to materialize known alliances between Turkey and Iran.

Domestic reactions

Iraq 
The parliament of the Kurdistan region criticized the attacks   while Iraq demanded that Turkey stops violating the Iraqi airspace and terrorizing the population in the area.

In August 2020, Iraq canceled a ministerial meeting and summoned the Turkish ambassador as Iraq blamed Turkey for a drone strike that killed two high-ranking Iraqi military officers. Officials called it a "blatant Turkish drone attack" in the autonomous Kurdish region in northern Iraq.

International reactions

UN-member countries 
In June 2020, the United States Commission on International Religious Freedom accused Turkey that it threatened Yazidis families who attempted to return to their homes in the Sinjar. Turkey rejected the claims.

International organizations 
The Arab League condemned the operation based on violation of Iraq's sovereign space. Turkey criticized the declaration, on the claim of PKK itself affecting Iraq's sovereignty.

Protests 
Protests condemning the airstrikes were held in Duhok province but also in several countries in Europe. In London a Kurdish protester forced a car transporting Boris Johnson to stop in order to raise awareness to the situation of the Kurds in Iraqi Kurdistan.

See also 
Operation Claw-Eagle 2
Operations Claw-Lightning and Thunderbolt
Operation Claw-Lock

References 

2020 airstrikes
2020 in international relations
2020 in Iraq
Airstrikes conducted by the Turkish Air Force
Cross-border operations of Turkey into Iraq
June 2020 events in Iraq
Kurdish–Turkish conflict (2015–present)
Military operations involving Iran
Iran–Turkey relations